Orhangazi is a rural district of Bursa Province in Turkey. The region Orhangazi was established in was conquered by Orhan I of the Ottoman dynasty in 1326. Orhangazi is named after Orhan I who was the second sultan of the Ottoman Empire.

 Olive production is a major part of the economy.
 The archeological digs of Ilıpınar Hoyuk are in the region of Orhangazi, and can be visited.
 Orhangazi is located near the lake Iznik and near the Sea of Marmara

Orhangazi has a number of villages around it, there is a local bus garage to take visitors to them. One of the villages, Keramet, has a natural hot springs. Main roads leading to the villages have olive fields on both sides. The population of the city is 80,000 while its surrounding villages and towns make up a total of 85,000 for the Orhangazi district.

History
From 1867 until 1922, Orhangazi was part of Hüdavendigâr vilayet. The town was captured by the Greek Army in 1919 and its population was massacred.

Sport
The route of the 130k İznik Ultramarathon, established in 2012, passes through villages in Orhangazi district around Lake İznik. An 80k part of it, the Orhangazi Ultra, ends in Örnekköy in Orhangazi district on the route's westernmost point.

References

 
Cities in Turkey
Populated places in Bursa Province
Districts of Bursa Province